Jovan Soldatović (November 26, 1920 in Čerević – October 7, 2005 in Novi Sad) was a Serbian sculptor, internationally recognized for hundreds of sculptures and memorials.

Soldatović studied at  the Faculty of Applied Arts in Belgrade. He participated in the World War II as a member of Yugoslav partisans.

Gallery

References

External links
Sculptor Jovan Soldatovic - Official website
Vojvodina Biography
Serbian sculpture

Serbian sculptors
Male sculptors
1920 births
2005 deaths
20th-century sculptors
Yugoslav sculptors